Blaundus was a Greek city founded during the Hellenistic period in Asia Minor, presently Anatolia (Asian Turkey), and is now a Latin Catholic titular bishopric.

History 
The ancient city was between the regions of Lydia and Phrygia in the Seleucid Empire. Its ruins are at Sülümenli (formerly Süleimanli), near Ulubey (formerly Göbek) in Uşak Province of modern Turkey.

Greek coins have been discovered which write the city name as Mlaundus. A Greek inscription of the Roman period though write the city Blaundus. Probably it is also the Blaeandrus that the Ptolemy is mentioning.

Recent findings of cylinder-seals in archaeological excavation point  towards the conclusion that there was a settlement already stablished at the beginning of the II millennium B.C., belonging to the Assyrian trade colony period.

Bishopric 
In the Roman and Byzantine eras, the city was the seat of a bishopric, a suffragan of the Metropolitan Archdiocese of Sardes. The diocese was known by the names Blaundus, Blandus and Balandus. It was part of the Patriarchate of Constantinople. In the 5th century AD, the bishopric was connected to the diocese center at Sebaste.

Three bishops of Blaundus are historically attested.

 Phoebus (fl. 359), who at the Council of Seleucia in 359 distanced himself from his fellow Arians, signing the orthodox formula drafted by Acacio of Caesarea, and for this reason was deposed.
 Elijah or Helias (fl. 451) who took part in the Council of Chalcedon of 451.
 Onesiphorus (fl. 458), who signed a letter written by the bishops of Lydia to Emperor Leo in 458 following the killing of Proterius of Alexandria.

Additionally, a certain Eustathius of Alandos attended the Council of Constantinople (879-880) that rehabilitated Photius, but evidence is lacking that Alandos was the same as Balandus.

The last record of Blaundus dates from the 12th century.

The bishopric of Blaundus was nominally revived in 1953 as a titular see of the lowest (episcopal) rank, but has been vacant since January 31, 1971, after only two incumbents:

 Michael Mongkhol On Prakhongchit (1953.05.07 – 1958.01.23)
 Victor-Jean Perrin (1961.11.26 – 1971.01.31)

References

External links
 GigaCatholic, with titular incumbent biography links

Catholic titular sees in Asia
History of Uşak Province
Hellenistic colonies in Anatolia
Archaeological sites in the Aegean Region
Ancient Greek archaeological sites in Turkey
Former populated places in Turkey
Populated places in ancient Lydia
Populated places in Phrygia
Ulubey District